Ricardo Amezquita Carreño (born December 9, 1968), better known by his ring name Virus, is a Mexican luchador (or professional wrestler). He is currently working for Consejo Mundial de Lucha Libre (CMLL), and portrays a rudo ("Bad guy") wrestling character. Amezquita originally worked in CMLL's Minis division as Piratita Morgan, and held the CMLL World Mini-Estrella Championship under the name Damiancito El Guerrero, but was later moved into the regular division and given the name "Virus". He has served as one of the main trainers for CMLL's wrestling school, having had a hand in training hundreds of students at the CMLL school since 2008 either to some degree.

As Virus, Amezquita has held the CMLL Japan Super Lightweight Championship, CMLL World Super Lightweight Championship and the Mexican National Lightweight Championship as well as winning CMLL's annual Reyes del Aire tournament in 2007. In the Mini-Estrellas division he won the CMLL World Mini-Estrella Championship. He is currently the leader of Los Cancerberos del Infierno, a stable consisting of himself and Cancerbero.

Professional wrestling career
Ricardo Amezquita made his professional wrestling debut on April 20, 1986, under the ring name "Bird Boy", an enmascarado (or masked wrestler) with a bird inspired ring persona. He briefly teamed with Bird Boy II, but because of his small size he mainly worked on the low end of the card in the Universal Wrestling Association promotion. On July 27, 1991, Bird Boy defeated Super Archie to win the UWA World Featherweight Championship, as a part of a storyline feud between the two. The storyline culminated in Bird Boy defeating Super Archie in a Lucha de Apuestas, or "bet match", after which Super Archie had to remove his mask. As Bird Boy, he held the Featherweight title for over a year, losing it on August 25, 1992, to El Coralillo.

Consejo Mundial de Lucha Libre (1992–present)

Piratita Morgan and Damiancito El Guerrero (1992–1998)
Amezquita had already begun working with Consejo Mundial de Lucha Libre (CMLL) before he lost the UWA World Featherweight Championship, and became CMLL Exclusive after dropping the title. in 1992 then-CMLL booker Antonio Peña left CMLL to form his own promotion, Asistencia Asesoría y Administración (AAA); Peña had been the mastermind behind the CMLL Minis division and most of the Minis in CMLL decided to leave with Peña. Amezquita and a number of other wrestlers were brought in to replenish the division. Working in the Mini division does not mean that Amezquita has dwarfism, it is not uncommon for very short wrestlers to work in the "Mini" division in Mexico. Ricardo Amezquita was one of the wrestlers brought into CMLL to replenish the division after losing most of their workers and was given the ring persona of Piratita Morgan, a mini version of Pirata Morgan who worked in CMLL at the time and replaced the original Piratita Morgan that had left CMLL to join AAA. He often accompanied members of Los Bucaneros (Pirata Morgan and Rey Bucanero) to the ring, and would interfere on their behalf. Due to CMLL's policy of not having regular sized and Mini-Estrellas compete in the same match Piratita Morgan never officially teamed up with the rest of the "Bucaneros".  In 1994 Pirata Morgan left CMLL to join AAA as well, negating the need to have the smaller version of the character working for CMLL.

While trying to figure out a new ring character, Amezquita was offered the name "Damiancito El Guerrero" by Alfonso Lira, who worked as Damian El Guerrero at that time. He worked his first match under that name on November 6, 1994, when he and Ultratumbita lost to Orito and Ultimo Dragoncito. When he became Damiancito, Amezquita began working unmasked without losing a Lucha de Apuestas match. In 1995, Amezquita toured Japan and worked for the W*ING promotion where he was billed simply as "Damiancito", a mini version of Damián 666 who worked for W*ING at the time. Subsequently he has mistakenly been described as working as "Damiancito" or "Damiancto 666" in CMLL as well, but it was only in Japan that he worked as a mini of Damián 666 and is not related to Pequeño Damián 666.

After returning from Japan Damiancito El Guerrero defeated Máscarita Mágica to win the CMLL World Mini-Estrella Championship on February 27, 1996. The storyline between the two Mini-Estrellas later led to Damiancito defeating Mascarita Mágica in a Lucha de Apuestas bet match, where Mascarita Mágica was forced to have all his hair shaved off as a result of losing the match. In late 1997 CMLL booked an eight-man elimination match where the winner would earn the right to tag team with "regular sized" wrestlers. Damiancito El Guerrero defeated Cicloncito Ramírez, Tritoncito, Pequeño Cochisse, Platita, Guerrerito del Future, Pequeño Sayama an Fierito to earn the right to work with "regular sized" wrestlers.

Virus (1998–present)
In early 1998 he made his debut as part of the regular-sized division under the name "Virus", no mention was made that Virus used to work as Damiancito El Guerrero or that he still held the CMLL World Mini-Estrella Championship. On May 7, 1998, Virus defeated El Oriental to win the vacant Mexican National Lightweight Championship, a title CMLL had brought back to help showcase smaller workers such as Virus. After winning the title Virus worked a storyline feud against El Oriental, centering on Virus' Mexican Lightweight title and Orientál's Districto Federatl Lightweight title. Despite several title matches neither belt changed hands during the course of the storyline. By 1999 CMLL decided that it was time to crown a new CMLL World Mini-Estrella Champion as Virus was still technically the champion despite not having worked as a mini for over a year. Instead of making Virus return to the Minis division to lose the title CMLL decided to give the championship to Ultimo Dragoncito and then subsequently announce that Ultimo Dragoncito had "won" the title on an undisclosed day in October 1999. In 1999 to 2000 CMLL made several tours of Japan to establish a "CMLL Japan" branch, Virus was one of the workers who regularly toured Japan and would capture the CMLL Japan Super Lightweight Championship on November 25, 1999. On August 6, 2000 Virus lost the CMLL Japan Super Lightweight title to Ricky Marvin and then on November 29, 2000 also lost the Mexican National Lightweight title to Ricky Marvin. Virus continued to show that while he may not have the size to be a headliner he had a knack for helping young wrestlers improve by working with them in the ring.

On August 21, 2001 Virus participated in his first major CMLL tournament, the Torneo Gran Alternativa ("Great Alternative Tournament") where he was teamed up with Blue Panther. In the first round they defeated the team of Alan Stone and Mr. Niebla but lost to Olímpico and Sicodelico Jr., who would go on to win the entire tournament. After having been a Rudo (a Heel, or bad guy) his entire career Virus was turned Tecnico (Face or good guy) in 2002. In 2003 he took part in a series of matches between CMLL tecnicos, himself, Ricky Marvin and Volador Jr., and a group called "the Havana Brothers" based out of southern California that consisted of Rocky Romero, Ricky Reyes and T. J. Perkins). The well received series of matches between the six led CMLL to create the CMLL World Super Lightweight Championship. Rocky Romero became the first champion but lost the title to Virus on November 14, 2003. Virus held the title for 392 days before losing it back to Rocky Romero. In 2005 Virus was turned Rudo once more and generally used to help young, high-flying tecnicos get more experience. Over the summer of 2006 Virus represented CMLL in All Japan Pro Wrestling's Junior Heavyweight League tournament. He ended up winning only one match, defeating MAZADA but lost to Katsuhiko Nakajima and Katsushi Takemura, failing to advance in the tournament. On October 2, 2007 Virus won CMLL's recurring Reyes del Aire ("Kings of the Air") tournament outlasting 11 other competitors in a torneo cibernetico, lastly eliminating Valiente to win the match.

When El Satánico started working a reduced schedule in late 2008 Virus became the unofficial leader of Los Infernales, teaming with Euforia and Nosferatu. With Satánico reduced schedule Virus also took over a large portion of the training that El Satánico had been responsible for earlier. In a later interview he commented that he always wanted to become a trainer, he was just surprised at how quickly it happened.

Los Cancerberos del Infierno (2009–present)

At a CMLL press conference on November 19, 2009, it was officially announced that Virus was the leader of a new CMLL group called Los Cancerberos del Infierno (Spanish for "the Infernal Cerberos") a group that beyond Virus, consisted of Euforia and Pólvora as well as two new characters Cancerbero and Raziel. Cancerbero and Raziel previously worked under the ring names Messala and Caligula, otherwise known as Los Romanos, a low card Rudo tag team. On April 15, 2010 Virus was one of eight wrestlers to compete in a steel cage match where the last man in the cage would be unmasked. The match came down to  Virus and Super Brazo after Texano Jr., Máximo, Okumura, Rush, Taichi and Tony Rivera had left the cage. In the end Virus was able to climb out of the cage as well, forcing Super Brazo to have his hair shaved off as per the Lucha de Apuestas stipulations.

In late 2010 Mini-Estrella Demus 3:16 won a tournament to earn the right to work in the regular male division instead. Once promoted Demus 3:16 joined Los Cancereros and almost immediately started to develop friction with Virus, as Demus 3:16 tried to take over as the leader of the group. The storyline came to a conclusion on March 11, 2011, when Virus defeated Demus 3:16 in a Luchas de Apuestas match, which let Virus keep his position as the leader of Los Cancerberos del Infierno and send Demus back into the Mini-Estrellas division.

On June 7, 2011, Virus defeated Guerrero Maya Jr. in a tournament final to regain the World Super Lightweight Championship. As a result of his title win Virus participated in the 2011 Universal Championship tournament, where he lost to Averno in the first round. In early 2012 Virus began working an extended storyline against fellow rudo Loco Max, as part of an ongoing rivalry between Los Cancerberos and Los Guerreros Tuareg. On March 12 Virus defeated Loco Max in a Lucha de Apuestas match, forcing Loco Max to have his hair shaved off.

Over the summer of 2012 Euforia left Los Cancerberos to join the Los Guerreros del Infierno group, and late 2012 Pólvora also left the group, teaming up with Rey Escorpión and Dragón Rojo Jr. to form a new trio known as Los Revolucionarios del Terror. After a four-year reign, including eight successful championship defenses, Virus lost the title to Dragon Lee on April 5, 2015. In January 2016, Virus made his debut for New Japan Pro-Wrestling (NJPW) by taking part in the CMLL and NJPW co-produced Fantastica Mania 2016 tour. On the fifth show, he unsuccessfully challenged Dragon Lee for the CMLL World Lightweight Championship.

Working as a trainer
Over the years Amezquita has worked as one of the main trainers for CMLL's wrestling school in Mexico City and thus has hand a hand in training a number of men, women and Mini-Estrellas that work for CMLL or for other Mexican wrestling promotions. Beyond running the school during the day his training continues on CMLL's shows where he uses his rudo role to help younger, inexperienced or lower ranked wrestlers gain more in-ring experience and further their training. Some of the wrestlers he has a significant hand in training includes Mini-Estrellas Acero, Aéreo, Mercurio and Pentagoncito, female wrestlers Goya Kong, Lady Afrodita and Skadi. He also helped train several of the male wrestlers currently working for CMLL include Blue Panther Jr., El Cuatrero, Disturbio, Flyer, Gran Guerrero, Black Panther, Pólvora, Puma, Sanson, Soberano Jr., Star Jr., Tiger and more.

Through his behind-the-scenes role as a trainer, Amequita also got the opportunity to act as the on-screen coach a team of participants for CMLL's En Busca de un Ídolo tournament in 2013, 2014 and 2015, helping them not only improve their wrestling skills but also their stamina, wrestling characters and interactions with the crowd. In 2013 his team consisted of Misterioso Jr., Vangelis, Sangre Azteca and Tiger. For 2014 his group consisted of Guerrero Negro Jr., Hechicero, Star Jr. and Super Halcón Jr. and in 2015 he trained a group consisting of Boby Zavala, Disturbio, Esfinge, and Flyer. In 2013 Virus team member Vangelis won the tournament, and in 2015 "Team Virus" member Boby Zavala won the tournament.

Wrestlers trained

Acero
Aéreo
Akuma
Andros de Plata
Arceus
Audaz
Atlantis Jr.
Ave Rez
Black Panther
Black Thunder
Blue Panther Jr.
Bugambilia
El Cholo
El Cuatrero
Disturbio
Dranser
Flyer
Goya Kong
Gran Guerrero
Guerrero Negro Jr.
Hiroshi Yamato
Horus
KAI
Lady Afrodita
Mercurio
Mircoman
Nahual
Pentagoncito Black
Pequeño Cisne
Pólvora
Principe Diamante
Psicosis Jr.
Puma King
Rene Guajardo III
Sansón
Scravos
Skadi
Soberano Jr.
Star Jr.
Súper Astro Jr.
La Tormenta
Tiger
Ultraman Jr.
Volcano

Championships and accomplishments
Consejo Mundial de Lucha Libre
CMLL Japan Super Lightweight Championship (2 times)
CMLL World Mini-Estrella Championship (1 time)
CMLL World Super Lightweight Championship / CMLL World Lightweight Championship (2 times)
CMLL World Trios Championship (1 time) – with Cancerbero and Raziel
Mexican National Lightweight Championship (1 time)
Reyes del Aire (2007)
Mexican National Trios Championship (1 time) – with Cancerbero and Raziel
Pro Wrestling Illustrated
PWI ranked him #242 of the top 500 wrestlers in the PWI 500 in 2012
Universal Wrestling Association
UWA World Featherweight Championship (1 time)

Luchas de Apuestas record

Footnotes

References

1968 births
Mexican male professional wrestlers
Mini-Estrella wrestlers
Living people
Professional wrestlers from Mexico City
Professional wrestling trainers
20th-century professional wrestlers
21st-century professional wrestlers
Mexican National Trios Champions
CMLL World Lightweight Champions
CMLL World Mini-Estrella Champions
CMLL World Trios Champions